Frantz Fanon: Black Skin, White Mask is a 1997 docudrama film about the life of the martiniquais psychiatrist and civil rights activist Frantz Fanon. The film was directed by Isaac Julien.

Story 
Its plot is interspersed archive footage of Fanon as well as interviews with family members and colleagues of Fanon, including Stuart Hall.

Cast  
 Colin Salmon as Frantz Fanon

References

External links 

 
 
 

1997 films
1990s English-language films
Black British films